The U.S. and Japan Mutual Defense Assistance Agreement was signed on March 8, 1954 in Tokyo between John Allison of the United States and Katsuo Okazaki of Japan. The accord contained eleven articles and seven amendments (or annexes). The agreement dictated that both the United States and Japan support each other militarily. Specifically, it permitted the United States to station its troops on Japanese soil in order to maintain security in the region. Moreover, Japan was obligated to take responsibility in protecting itself and was permitted to rearm for defensive purposes only. Ultimately, the agreement was ratified on May 1, 1954.

See also
Security Treaty Between the United States and Japan
List of treaties

References

External links
U.S. and Japan Mutual Defense Assistance Agreement (Full Text)

Foreign relations of Post-war Japan
1954 in Japan
1954 in the United States
Treaties concluded in 1954
Japan–United States military relations
Military alliances involving the United States
Japan–United States treaties